The following television stations operate on virtual channel 32 in the United States:

 K15IX-D in Rainier, Oregon
 K16MU-D in Scipio, Utah
 K18DR-D in Cortez, etc., Colorado
 K18MW-D in Leamington, Utah
 K18NQ-D in Rhinelander, Wisconsin
 K21KE-D in Canyonville, Oregon
 K31GN-D in La Grande, Oregon
 K31HK-D in Rainier, Oregon
 K31ON-D in Fillmore, etc., Utah
 K32EB-D in Alexandria, Minnesota
 K32EM-D in Morongo Valley, California
 K32FW-D in Pierre, South Dakota
 K32GB-D in Agana, Guam
 K32JQ-D in Manhattan, Kansas
 K32JT-D in Farmington, New Mexico
 K32JU-D in Tampico, etc., Montana
 K32JW-D in Fillmore, etc., Utah
 K32KT-D in Wichita Falls, Texas
 K32KY-D in Pasco, Washington
 K32LO-D in Prescott, Arizona
 K32OG-D in Pueblo, Colorado
 K32PB-D in Lake Charles, Louisiana
 K34QY-D in Golden Valley, Arizona
 KAZQ in Albuquerque, New Mexico
 KBFD-DT in Honolulu, Hawaii
 KBIN-TV in Council Bluffs, Iowa
 KDYS-LD in Spokane, Washington
 KEHO-LD in Houston, Texas
 KFAW-LD in Midland, Texas
 KFKK-LD in Stockton, California
 KJEO-LD in Fresno, California
 KJTV-CD in Wolfforth, Texas
 KMTP-TV in San Francisco, California
 KMYN-LD in Duluth, Minnesota
 KQKC-LD in Topeka, Kansas
 KRCW-TV in Salem, Oregon
 KRIN in Waterloo, Iowa
 KRMS-LD in Lake Ozark, Missouri
 KSBT-LD in Santa Barbara, California
 KSTV-LD in Sacramento, California
 KTAB-TV in Abilene, Texas
 KTFV-CD in McAllen, Texas
 KUTH-DT in Provo, Utah
 KWSM-LD in Santa Maria, California
 KXKW-LD in Lafayette, Louisiana
 KYPK-LD in Yakima, Washington
 W17EA-D in Arroyo, Puerto Rico
 W18FC-D in Florence, South Carolina
 W32DH-D in Erie, Pennsylvania
 W32DJ-D in Melbourne, Florida
 W33EG-D in Lumberton, Mississippi
 W32EI-D in Port Jervis, New York
 W32EQ-D in Tuscaloosa, Alabama
 W32EW-D in Roanoke, Virginia
 W32FK-D in Valdosta, Georgia
 W32FN-D in Macon, Georgia
 W32FS-D in Bangor, Maine
 W32FY-D in Clarksburg, West Virginia
 W35ED-D in Florence, South Carolina
 WACY-TV in Appleton, Wisconsin
 WANN-CD in Atlanta, Georgia
 WCSN-LD in Columbus, Ohio
 WDOX-LD in Palm Beach, Florida
 WELU in Aguadilla, Puerto Rico
 WFLD in Chicago, Illinois
 WFQX-TV in Cadillac, Michigan
 WGDV-LD in Salisbury, Maryland
 WGTA in Toccoa, Georgia
 WHDN-CD in Naples, Florida
 WHDS-LD in Savannah, Georgia
 WHUT-TV in Washington, D.C.
 WLAE-TV in New Orleans, Louisiana
 WLKY in Louisville, Kentucky
 WMBF-TV in Myrtle Beach, South Carolina
 WMOR-TV in Lakeland, Florida
 WNCF in Montgomery, Alabama
 WNDR-LD in Auburn, New York
 WNYX-LD in New York, New York
 WRAP-LD in Cleveland, Ohio
 WRNT-LD in Hartford, Connecticut
 WTCV in San Juan, Puerto Rico
 WWHL-LD in Nashville, Tennessee
 WXNY-LD in New York, New York

The following station, which is no longer licensed, formerly operated on virtual channel 32:
 K04RA-D in Clarksville, Arkansas
 K32DR-D in Granite Falls, Minnesota
 K32EL-D in Shoshoni, Wyoming
 K32JE-D in Quincy, Washington
 K32JG-D in Rapid City, South Dakota
 K32JJ-D in Rolla, Missouri
 K32JK-D in Boise, Idaho
 K32JM-D in Twin Falls, Idaho
 KCLG-LD in Neosho, Missouri
 KRCW-LP in Portland, Oregon
 KYWF-LD in Wichita Falls, Texas
 W32DU-D in La Grange, Georgia
 WNAL-LD in Scottsboro, Alabama
 WUEA-LD in Lafayette, Indiana

References

32 virtual